Novosedlice is a municipality and village in Teplice District in the Ústí nad Labem Region of the Czech Republic. It has about 2,100 inhabitants.

Notable people
Gustav Münzberger (1903–1977), German Nazi war criminal

References

External links

Villages in Teplice District